Giuseppe Del Rosso (May 16, 1760 – December 22, 1831) was an architect and architectural writer mainly in late 18th and early 19th-century Florence and Tuscany. He became a collaborator with Marco Lastri in the editorship of a 6 volume set of observations on cultural monuments and buildings in Florence, which proved as a guide, sometimes anecdotal, for the sophisticated foreign travelers, titled L'Osservatore fiorentino sugli edifizj della sua patria.
 
He was born in Rome, the son of the architect Zanobi Del Rosso, and obtained his first commissions from the Grand-Duke Peter Leopold of Habspurg-Lorraine. He helped design the Teatro Goldoni in Florence. Among his publications are:
Osservazioni di Giuseppe Del Rosso su la Basilica fiesolana di S. Alessandro (1790).
Ricerche storico-architettoniche sopra el singolarissimo tempio di San Giovanni di Firenze (1820).

References

18th-century Italian architects
19th-century Italian architects
Italian neoclassical architects